Patrick Schneider (born 30 November 1992) is a German sprinter specialising in the 400 metres. He represented his country at two outdoor European Championships as well as the 2018 Athletics World Cup.

He switched from football to athletics in 2014.

International competitions

Personal bests
Outdoor
200 metres – 21.02 (+1.3 m/s, Heilbronn 2016)
400 metres – 45.82 (Nürnberg 2018)
800 metres – 1:49.54 (Neustadt 2016)
Indoor
200 metres – 21.73 (München 2018)

References

1992 births
Living people
German male sprinters
People from Ansbach
Sportspeople from Middle Franconia
LAC Quelle Fürth athletes